is a member of the Constitutional Democratic Party in the House of Representatives, representing Hokkaido's 11th district after being elected for the first time. She was an analyst for Nippon BS Broadcasting before meeting her husband, Tomohiro Ishikawa, with whom she has two children. Ishikawa was born in Yokohama and graduated from the University of the Sacred Heart.

References

1984 births
Living people
Female members of the House of Representatives (Japan)
Constitutional Democratic Party of Japan politicians
Members of the House of Representatives (Japan)
20th-century Japanese women
21st-century Japanese women politicians